The Dallara F3 2019 is an open-wheel racing car developed by Italian manufacturer Dallara for use in the FIA Formula 3 Championship, a feeder series for Formula One. The F3 2019 is the first car used by the FIA Formula 3 Championship and was introduced for the championship's inaugural season. As the Formula 3 Championship is a spec series, the F3 2019 is raced by every team and driver competing in the series. The F3 2019 was unveiled at the weekend of the final GP3 Series round in Abu Dhabi in November 2018 and later made its first public appearance when teams contesting the inaugural championship completed a test day at the Circuit de Nevers Magny-Cours in February 2019.

Design

Chassis

The chassis is largely identical to the GP3/16 chassis but with a few tweaks. Modifications to the chassis include a new front end with a range of suspension setup possibilities and anti-intrusion side panels as part of a push to improve safety.

The chassis also features the "halo" cockpit protection device, a wishbone-shaped frame mounted to the monocoque designed to deflect debris away from a driver's head in the case of an accident.

The rear wing still incorporates the Drag Reduction Systems (DRS) rear wing flap in a purpose for overtaking maneuver assist.

Engine package

Tyres
Pirelli would remain as preferred official tyre partner and supplier of FIA Formula 3 Championship from 2019 season onwards. The tyre sizes and layouts were same as Dallara GP3/10, Dallara GP3/13 and Dallara GP3/16 tyre designs and thus kept the traditional 13-inch wheel rims.

See also
 Dallara F2 2018

References

External links

 FIA Formula 3 Championship official website

FIA Formula 3 Championship
Open wheel racing cars
F3 2019
Formula Three cars